Higaonna Kanryu (1849-1922) was a Ryukyuan karateka well known for his calligraphy and Chinese studies as well as his martial arts. He learned his martial arts under Wai Shinzan and not under Ru Ru Ko as some believe. His relative Higaonna Kanryō studied under both these Chinese kung fu masters.

Because of the similarity of their names, Higaonna Kanryu ("East Higaonna") and Higaonna Kanryō ("West Higaonna") are frequently confused with each other.

References

1849 births
1922 deaths
Okinawan male karateka